Ciutat de Lleida Trophy is a "friendly" football (soccer) tournament played annually in Lleida (province of Lleida, Catalonia, Spain).

Ciutat de Lleida Trophy

1 Lleida Selection was a team formed by players from CF Balaguer, UE Tàrrega and FC Benavent.

References 

UE Lleida
Catalan football friendly trophies